The 1937 Kilkenny Senior Hurling Championship was the 43rd staging of the Kilkenny Senior Hurling Championship since its establishment by the Kilkenny County Board.

James Stephens won the championship after a 3-08 to 1-02 defeat of Dicksboro in the final. It was their second championship title overall and their first title in two championship seasons.

References

Kilkenny Senior Hurling Championship
Kilkenny Senior Hurling Championship